Playguy was an American gay pornographic monthly magazine that was geared to gay men under 25. It was established by George W. Mavety in 1976. It was published by Modernismo Publications, Ltd., which also published Mandate, Honcho, Torso, Inches, Black Inches and Latin Inches. It was later published by Mavety Media Group Ltd. until it closed down in October 2009, nine years after Mavety's death in the year 2000.

Playguy should not be confused with Playboy, which is geared to straight men nor with Playgirl, which is geared mainly to women, with some additional gay men readership.

References

LGBT-related magazines published in the United States
Monthly magazines published in the United States
Pornographic magazines published in the United States
Defunct magazines published in the United States
Gay male pornography in the United States
Gay male pornographic magazines
Magazines established in 1976
Magazines disestablished in 2009